Tingerup Tykke is a woodland located south of Rønnede on the island of Zealand in eastern Denmark. It is the site of source of the Suså River, Denmark's 5th largest river. Tingerup Tykke is located just south of Rønnede, some 20 kilometers east of Næstved.

Lakes of Zealand
Forests of Denmark
Geography of Næstved Municipality